The Lotus Ethos is a fully plug-in hybrid concept car that was unveiled at the 2010 Paris Motor Show as the "Lotus CityCar". The vehicle was developed by Lotus Engineering, a separate division from Lotus Cars. The concept car is designed for flex-fuel operation on ethanol, or methanol as well as regular petrol.

Specifications
The concept car weighs less than 1400 kg, and Lotus claims it will reach  from rest in 9 seconds.

Naming and production plans
In 2011 Lotus named the concept the Lotus Ethos. It is based on the EMAS from its parent company Proton and is likely to be assembled in Malaysia alongside the EMAS for an estimated cost in the UK of "£30,000 plus".

See also
Chevrolet Volt
Proton EMAS

References

External links 
 Ethos City Car at Lotus Cars site

Ethos
Concept cars
Plug-in hybrid vehicles
Cars introduced in 2010